Greek morphemes are parts of words originating from the Greek language. This article lists Greek morphemes used in the English language.

Common morphemes

See also
English words of Greek origin

References

External links 
 Greek Morphemes, Khoff, Mountainside Middle School 
 English vocabulary elements, Keith M. Denning, Brett Kessler, William R. Leben, William Ronald Leben, Oxford University Press US, 2007, 320pp, p. 127,  at Google Books

Greek language
English etymology
Lists of etymologies